Poidevin is a surname. Notable people with the surname include:

Eugène Modeste Edmond Poidevin  (1806-1870), French painter
Les Poidevin (1876–1931), Australian tennis player
Robin Le Poidevin (born 1962), British metaphysicist
Sara Poidevin (born 1996), Canadian racing cyclist
Simon Poidevin (born 1958), Australian rugby union player